WVOW-FM is a Full Service formatted broadcast radio station licensed to Logan, West Virginia, serving Southern West Virginia.  WVOW-FM is owned and operated by Logan Broadcasting Corporation.

References

External links
 WVOW Radio Online
 

1969 establishments in West Virginia
Full service radio stations in the United States
Radio stations established in 1969
VOW-FM